The Pennsylvania General Assembly is the legislature of the U.S. commonwealth of Pennsylvania. The legislature convenes in the State Capitol building in Harrisburg. In colonial times (1682–1776), the legislature was known as the Pennsylvania Provincial Assembly and was unicameral. Since the Constitution of 1776, the legislature has been known as the General Assembly. The General Assembly became a bicameral legislature in 1791.

Membership
The General Assembly has 253 members, consisting of a Senate with 50 members and a House of Representatives with 203 members, making it the second-largest state legislature in the nation, behind New Hampshire, and the largest full-time legislature.

Senators are elected for a term of four years. Representatives are elected for a term of two years. The Pennsylvania general elections are held on the Tuesday after the first Monday in November in even-numbered years. A vacant seat must be filled by special election, the date of which is set by the presiding officer of the respective house.

Senators must be at least 25 years old, and Representatives at least 21 years old. They must be citizens and residents of the state for a minimum of four years and reside in their districts for at least one year. Individuals who have been convicted of felonies, including embezzlement, bribery, and perjury, are ineligible for election; the state Constitution also adds the category of "other infamous crimes," which can be broadly interpreted by state courts.  No one who has been previously expelled from the General Assembly may be elected.

Legislative districts are drawn every ten years, following the U.S. Census. Districts are drawn by a five-member commission, of which four members are the majority and minority leaders of each house (or their delegates). The fifth member, who chairs the committee, is appointed by the other four and may not be an elected or appointed official. If the leadership cannot decide on a fifth member, the State Supreme Court may appoint him or her.

While in office, legislators may not hold civil office. Even if a member resigns, the Constitution states that the legislator may not be appointed to civil office for the duration of the term to which the legislator was elected.

Legislative sessions

The General Assembly is a continuing body within the term for which its representatives are elected. It convenes at 12 o'clock noon on the first Tuesday of January each year and then meets regularly throughout the year. Both houses adjourn on November 30 in even-numbered years, when the terms of all members of the House and half the members of the Senate expire.  Neither body can adjourn for more than three days without the consent of the other.

The governor may call a special session in order to press for legislation on important issues. As of 2017, only 35 special sessions have been called in the history of Pennsylvania.

The Assembly meets in the Pennsylvania State Capitol, which was completed in 1906.  Under the Pennsylvania Constitution, the Assembly must meet in the City of Harrisburg and can move only if given the consent of both chambers.

History

During the mid-19th century, the frustration of the people of the Commonwealth of Pennsylvania with the extremely severe level of corruption in the General Assembly culminated in a constitutional amendment in 1864 which prevented the General Assembly from writing statutes covering more than one subject.  Unfortunately, the amendment (today found at Section 3 of Article III of the Pennsylvania Constitution) was so poorly written that it also prevented the General Assembly from undertaking a comprehensive codification of the Commonwealth's statutes until another amendment was pushed through in 1967 to provide the necessary exception.  This is why today, Pennsylvania is the only U.S. state that has not yet completed a comprehensive codification of its general statutory law. Pennsylvania is currently undertaking its first official codification process in the Pennsylvania Consolidated Statutes.

General assembly leadership, 2023–2024

Pennsylvania House of Representatives
Speaker of the House of Representatives: Joanna McClinton (D)

Pennsylvania State Senate
President Pro Tempore: Kim Ward (R)

See also
 2005 Pennsylvania General Assembly pay raise controversy
 Pennsylvania Provincial Assembly, for the General Assembly before 1776
 Pennsylvania Legislative Black Caucus

References

External links

 Pennsylvania General Assembly
 Legislative Process
 
 Catalog of the State Library of Pennsylvania

 
Pennsylvania State Capitol Complex
Bicameral legislatures